Mangudi is a village in Sankarankoil Taluk, Tenkasi District in the state of Tamil Nadu, India.

Geography
The nearest towns are Rajapalaiyam, Srivilliputtur and Sankarankovil.

History 
Mangudi is an ancient village. The author of Maduraikanchi i.e. Mangudi Marudhanar came from Mangudi. Surface explorations by the Department of Archaeology have found black and red ware pieces containing Tamil Brahmi inscriptions (dated 2nd century BC)

Demographics
As on 2009, Mangudi has a population of 1876.

Festivals
 Panguni festival (3 days)
 Aadi festival (3 days)
 Thamizhar Thirunal Pongal vizha
 Manju virattu

Schools in Mangudi 
TDTA Middle School
P.K.Hr.Sec.School
R.C.High School

Tailoring center in Mangudi 
All are doing in job works in tailoring industries, Annai Theresa Mahalir SHG Tailoring Training Center, Kavitha Nighty, Nithila Nighty, Thangamanatheri-Malakani.T Empriding

References
The tamil movie Bombay is set in the village of Mangudi

External links
 Writer S.Ramakrishnan on Mangudi Marudhanar
 Writer PRAVEEN s/o Tamilselvan on Mangudi Marudhanar

Villages in Tirunelveli district